Ísafjarðardjúp is a large fjord in the Westfjords region of Iceland. Its name translates to Depth of the fjord of sea ice.

Ísafjörður, capital of the Westfjords region, is situated close to the mouth of Ísafjarðardjúp in Skutulsfjörður.

The north-eastern coast is fairly straight with the only inlet being Kaldalón, but the southern side has fjords extending well into the land: Skutulsfjörður, Álftafjörður, Seyðisfjörður, Hestfjörður, Skötufjörður, Mjóifjörður, Reykjafjörður and Ísafjörður.

Three islands lie in Ísafjarðardjúp: Borgarey, Æðey and Vigur. Borgarey is the smallest with no inhabitants and Æðey the largest. On both Æðey and Vigur there is one farmstead.

On the peninsula of Reykjanes, there are hot springs and hydrothermal alteration.

In the bottom of the fjord lies the former trading post Arngerðareyri.

References

Fjords of Iceland
Westfjords